Youssef Dawoud  (10 March 1933 – 24 June 2012) was a Coptic Egyptian actor, who worked in theatre, cinema and television.

Dawoud started acting when studying at Alexandria University. After graduating from the Faculty of Engineering Department of Electricity, Alexandria University, in 1960, he worked for Alexandria Oils and Soap Company and engaged in amateur acting until 1986 when he took up acting full-time. He played the part of the British General Lipton in the United Artist production of Zuqaq Al-Madaq, based on the novel by Naguib Mahfouz. He moved to Cairo, joined the Actors' Syndicate and studied at the Theatre Institute. On turning professional, he became famous and a public figure.

Dawoud married in 1961 and had two children, a son and a daughter.

In the theatre, he performed in 
Mala'eeb (Ploys),
Al-Za'im (Leader) and
Al-Wad Sayed Al- Shaghal (Sayed the Servant Boy).

He appeared in the films 
Al-Nimr wal-Untha (The Tiger and the Woman),
Kaboria (Kaborya)
Samak Laban Tamr Hindi (Fish Milk Tamarind)
Al-Shaytana Allati Ahabbatni (The Devil Who Loved Me)
Morgan Ahmad Morgan (Morgan Ahmad Morgan).
 Assal Eswed (Molasses)
 Zarf Tariq (Tariq's Letter)

On television, he appeared in 
Al-Souq (The Market),
Samhouni Makansh Qasdi (Forgive Me I Didn't Mean To),
Al-Ganeb Al-Akhar (The Other Side)
Raafat El-Haggan.
 Yawmeyat Wanis [Wanis' Days]

References

External links

1933 births
2012 deaths
Egyptian male television actors
Egyptian male film actors
Alexandria University alumni
Egyptian male stage actors
Egyptian Copts